Heuringhem is a commune in the Pas-de-Calais department in the Hauts-de-France region of France.

Heuringhem is twinned with Sandhurst, Kent.

Geography
A village situated 4 miles (6 km) south of Saint-Omer, at the D195 and D477 crossroads.

Population

Places of interest
 The church of St.Riquier, dating from the seventeenth century.

See also
Communes of the Pas-de-Calais department

References

External links

 Statistical data, INSEE

Communes of Pas-de-Calais